The Magic Candle II is a 1991 role-playing video game for DOS. It was developed by Mindcraft Software Inc. and published by Electronic Arts, Inc.

The game takes place in a fantasy world, and has a feature to allow importing characters from the original game, The Magic Candle.

Gameplay

The game is notable for having a number of skills characters could train in to improve their effectiveness, including common role-playing game skills like "sword" and "magic", and less common skills, such as "music" and "carpentry".

The game is also notable for its magic system, which is similar to that of the seminal role-playing game Dungeons & Dragons: a magic-using character can study spells while camping at night, in order to be able to cast them the next day.

Reception
Computer Gaming Worlds Scorpia stated in 1992 that "Magic Candle II is an uneven sequel ... many improvements have been made, and some good touches added [but] not all those improvements have been properly implemented and, with the excessive combat, makes the game irritating at times". She concluded that the game was "still several cuts above the typical CRPG" and stated that fans of the first game would enjoy it. Stefan Petrucha wrote that year that "on a technical basis, MC2 doesn't fare well at all" compared to the Ultima series, describing the graphics as "archaic". He called NPC management "cumbersome" and the built-in notes "either uselessly massive" or "fail to record important data". He nonetheless called the story "a resounding success ... eccentric and fun", and recommended the game "to whom a CRPG means story, quirky characters and plenty of atmosphere". In 1993, Scorpia stated that while better than other CRPGs, Magic Candle II "isn't quite up to its predecessor".

References

External links

1991 video games
DOS games
DOS-only games
Role-playing video games
Video games developed in the United States
Single-player video games
Video game sequels
Mindcraft games
Electronic Arts games